Columbus Grove High School is a public high school in Columbus Grove, Ohio, United States, the only high school in the Columbus Grove School district.

Sports
Its sports teams participate in the Northwest Conference and Putnam County League. Both athletic bodies are sanctioned by the Ohio High School Athletic Association.

Columbus Grove's main rival is the Pandora-Gilboa Rockets, though the Bluffton Pirates and Ada Bulldogs are also considered rivals. The school has been an active American football school since the early 1900s, and the majority of its seasons have been winning seasons. The school's mascot is the Bulldog, along with several other area schools.

The 2003 Columbus Grove Bulldog American football team won the school's first and only state title in football, having gone 15 wins and 0 losses, including its 28–26 win in Canton Stadium over the Marion Local Flyers. The Columbus Grove 2003 men's track and field team has a similar honor, having won the state championship in spring 2003.

References

External links
 

High schools in Putnam County, Ohio
Public high schools in Ohio